Hellgate could refer to:

Hellgate: London, a 2007 computer game
Hellgate (1952 film), an American Western
Hellgate (1970 film), a Hong Kong film produced by Shaw Brothers Studio
Hellgate (1989 film), a horror film starring Ron Palillo
Hellgate (2011 film), a horror film starring Cary Elwes

Places
 Hellgate (Colorado), a mountain pass in Saguache County, Colorado, United States.
 Hellgate (Oregon), a pass in Wasco County, Oregon, United States.

See also 
Gates of Hell (disambiguation)
Hell Gate (disambiguation)
Hells Gate (disambiguation)